The men's 400 metres competition of the athletics events at the 2019 Pan American Games will take place between the 7 and 8 of August at the 2019 Pan American Games Athletics Stadium. The defending Pan American Games champion is Luguelin Santos from the Dominican Republic.

Summary
Demish Gaye on the outside and Bralon Taplin in the middle of the track edged out to a slight lead, but down the backstretch it was almost an even stagger across the track.  Through the turn, Taplin started to lose ground putting Gaye into the lead coming off the turn.  Really as they hit the straightaway, Gaye's one step forward and Anthony Zambrano's one step back were the only thing that interrupted a shoulder to shoulder wall across the track.  On the run for home, Taplin and defending champion Luguelín Santos went out the back.  Gaye continue to hold the edge as the others struggled.  The only one to make a serious forward move was Zambrano, who gained all the way past Gaye to take the win.  17 year old Justin Robinson picked up bronze.

Records
Prior to this competition, the existing world and Pan American Games records were as follows:

Schedule

Results
All times shown are in seconds.

Semifinal
Qualification: First 3 in each heat (Q) and next 2 fastest (q) qualified for the final. The results were as follows:

Final
The results were as follows:

References

Athletics at the 2019 Pan American Games
2019